Diastatops pullata is a species of dragonfly in the family Libellulidae.

References

    

Libellulidae
Insects described in 1839
Taxa named by Hermann Burmeister